The Fort of Justices (officially Fort Pajol) was built in the 1860s or early 1870s located in Montrapon-Fontaine-Écu, Besançon, Franche-Comté. It was constructed for use in the Franco-Prussian War to stop the Prussian forces from invading from Vesoul, but was never used in battle and was abandoned. It was later demolished in the 1980s.

In the 1800s, the French government decided to construct defences as there was a possible war with Germany. The defence of Besançon had hardly changed since the guidance of Sébastien Le Prestre de Vauban which had provided the city with its citadel, but it was agreed that new fortifications were essential. At least 25 forts were constructed within  of Besançon.

The exact date of construction is unknown, but it is believed to have been in the 1860s or early 1870s. The construction of the fort was not subject to strategic research, and was the reaction of a possible attack from Germany, explaining the simplicity of the buildings. None of the forts around Besançon were used in the Franco-Prussian War, and the building was abandoned after the war. Pierre Claude Pajol was responsible for the location of the fort, and it was designed to flank the Fort of Montboucons. The Fort of Justices was not used in World War One as Besançon was not involved in the conflict, and there is no evidence of it being used in World War Two.

The site is believed to have been abandoned just after the First World War, the fort's current location is occupied by the offices of the National Gendarmerie for Franche-Comté, and the fort was demolished in the mid-1980s. The fort measured , artillery was positioned on the front and smallest sides of the fort, and it was designed so the central buildings were protected from attack.

References

Justices
Demolished buildings and structures in France
Buildings and structures demolished in the 1980s
Buildings and structures in Besançon